Pobre diabla (Poor Devil) is a Peruvian telenovela which starred Angie Cepeda, Salvador del Solar, Arnaldo André and María Cristina Lozada. It was produced by América Producciónes and broadcast on América Televisión in 2000.

Cast 
 Angie Cepeda ..... Fiorella Morelli viuda de Mejía Guzmán
 Salvador del Solar ..... Andres Mejía Guzmán Jr.
 Arnaldo André ..... Andres Mejía Guzmán
 María Cristina Lozada ..... Roberta viuda de Mejía Guzmán. Villain
 Teddy Guzmán ..... Caridad López
 Camucha Negrete ..... Chabuca Flores de Morelli
 Ricardo Fernández ..... Luciano Morelli
 Katia Condos ..... Paula Mejía Guzmán
 Martha Figueroa ..... Patricia Mejía Guzmán de Hernández-Marín
 Hernán Romero ..... Diego Hernández-Marín. Villain
 Santiago Magill ..... Christian Mejía Guzmán
 Vanessa Saba ..... Rebeca Montenegro. Villain
 Javier Valdés ..... César Barrios
 Rossana Fernández Maldonado ..... Sandra Palacios
 Julián Legaspi ..... Luis Alberto Miller
 Carlos Victoria ..... Oscar Sandoval
 Gabriel Anselmi ..... José Guillen "Pichón"
 Erika Villalobos ..... Karina Linares
 Jesús Delaveaux ..... Orzabal
 Silvana Arias ..... Carmen
 Bruno Odar ..... Mario Paredes
 Ernesto Cabrejos ..... Antonio Jiménez
 Sergio Galliani ..... Garaban. Villain
 Ebelin Ortiz ..... Norma
 José Luis Ruiz ..... Joaquín Vallejo. Villain
 Elvira de la Puente ..... Elvira Moncayo
 Angelita Velasquez ..... Mercedes Farfan
 María Angélica Vega ..... Barbara Matos. Villain
 Maricielo Effio ..... Ofelia Caceres
 Haydee Caceres ..... Rufina Pérez
 Gianfranco Brero ..... Dr. Octavio Tapia
 Gilberto Torres ..... Chaveta
 Cecilia Rechkemmer ..... Silvana
 Javier Delgiudice
 Carlos Mesta ..... Juan Marquez
 Gabriela Billotti ..... Ana María Torreblanca
 Tatiana Espinoza ..... Ernestina
 Kareen Spano 
 Miguel Medina ..... Malandro
 Carlos Alcántara ..... Ramón Pedraza
 Antonio Arrue
 María José Zaldivar ..... Sor Angelina
 Mari Pili Barreda ..... Nini
 William Bell Taylor
 Gian Piero Mubarak ..... Carlitos Hernández-Marín Mejía-Guzmán
 Lucia Oxenford ..... Patty Hernández-Marín Mejía-Guzmán

Broadcasting

Americas 

 Argentina: Channel 10 Avellaneda and Cablevisión 
 Bolivia: Red PAT  
 Chile: Chilevisión 
 Colombia: Caracol Televisión and Novelas Caracol 
 Costa Rica: Teletica y Repretel 
 Ecuador: Televicentro 
 El Salvador: TCS Canal 6 
 Guatemala: Canal 13 of Ciudad de Guatemala 
 Mexico: TVC Networks 
 Nicaragua: Channel 2 
 Panamá: Telemetro 
 Paraguay: Paravisión Channel 5 Asunción and Unicanal 
 Perú: Panamericana Televisión y RBC Televisión 
 Uruguay: Channel 7 Montevideo and Multiseñal 
 Venezuela: Televen

Europe 

 Spain: 
 Italy: 
 United Kingdom: Channel 5 
 Germany: ZDF 
 Serbia: 3K (RTS) 
 Bulgaria: Eurocom TV
 Sweden:
 Poland:
 Greece:Star Channel (2003)
 Slovenia: Kanal A

Middle East

LBC Channels & Dubai TV (Dubbed into Arabic & Named: Fiorella) (175 Episodes)

External links
Pobre diabla at the Internet Movie Database

2000 telenovelas
Peruvian telenovelas
2000 Peruvian television series debuts
2001 Peruvian television series endings
Spanish-language telenovelas
América Televisión telenovelas